The vocal sac is the flexible membrane of skin possessed by most male frogs and toads. The purpose of the vocal sac is usually as an amplification of their mating or advertisement call. The presence or development of the vocal sac is one way of externally determining the sex of a frog or toad in many species; taking frogs as an example;

The vocal sac is open to the mouth cavity of the frog, with two slits on either side of the tongue. To call, the frog inflates its lungs and shuts its nose and mouth. Air is then expelled from the lungs, through the larynx, and into the vocal sac. The vibrations of the larynx emits a sound, which resonates on the elastic membrane of the vocal sac. The resonance causes the sound to be amplified and allows the call to carry further. Muscles within the body wall force the air back and forth between the lungs and vocal sac.

Development
The development of the vocal sac is different in most species, however they mostly follow the same process. The development of the unilobular vocal sac begins with two small growths on the floor of the mouth. These grow until they form two small pouches, which expand until they meet in the centre of the mouth and form one large cavity, which then grows until it is fully developed.

Purpose
The primary purpose of the vocal sac is to amplify the advertisement call of the male, and attract females from as large an area as possible. Modern frog species (neobatrachians and some mesobatrachians) which lack vocal sacs tend to inhabit areas close to flowing water. The sound of the flowing water overpowers the advertisement call, so they must advertise by other means.

An alternative use of the vocal sac is employed by the frogs of the family Rhinodermatidae. The males of the two species of this family scoop recently hatched tadpoles into their mouth, where they move into the vocal sac. The tadpoles of Darwin's frog (Rhinoderma darwinii) remain in the vocal sac until metamorphosis, whereas the Chile Darwin's frog (Rhinoderma rufum) will transport the tadpoles to a water source.

See also
Throat sac
Animal communication

References

Amphibian anatomy
Animal communication
Frogs